The 2005–06 Iowa Hawkeyes men's basketball team represented the University of Iowa as members of the Big Ten Conference during the 2005–06 NCAA Division I men's basketball season. The team was led by seventh-year head coach Steve Alford and played their home games at Carver–Hawkeye Arena. They finished the season 25–9 overall and 11–5 in Big Ten play. The Hawkeyes won the Big Ten tournament to receive an automatic bid to the NCAA tournament as #3 seed in the Atlanta Regional. The season ended in disappointment with an opening round loss at the buzzer to #14 seed Northwestern State, 64–63.

Roster

Schedule and results

|-
!colspan=9| Regular Season
|-

|-
!colspan=9| Big Ten tournament

|-
!colspan=9| NCAA tournament

Rankings

^Coaches did not release a Week 1 poll.
*AP does not release post-NCAA Tournament rankings

References

Iowa Hawkeyes
Iowa
Iowa Hawkeyes men's basketball seasons
Hawk
Hawk
Big Ten men's basketball tournament championship seasons